Mrveš is a village in southern Serbia (Serbia and Montenegro), with about 200 Serbian inhabitants. The nearest big city is Leskovac. As with many other villages in Serbia, Mrves has a problem with the constant migration of its inhabitants to larger cities and to foreign countries. People in Mrveš use a modified version of Serbian language.

Currently, major Mrveš population group are "Dzibudans".  

Populated places in Serbia